The Royal Commission on Hand-Loom Weavers was an enquiry in the United Kingdom into unemployment and poverty in the textile industry. It was set up in 1837, and issued a number of reports, to 1841.

Background
The number of handloom weavers in the United Kingdom was estimated at 400,000, and the economic consequences of industrial textile production bore heavily on them. Weaving on handlooms had experienced a boom in the decade 1795 to 1805. The fact-finding of the assistant commissioners in 1837–8 occurred against a background of widespread unrest.

The poor condition of handloom weavers was notorious in the 1830s, and was rapidly deteriorating. A parliamentary select committee produced reports on petitions from the weavers in 1834 and 1835. It was chaired by Sir John Maxwell, 7th Baronet, who with John Fielden called witnesses sympathetic to the weavers. Fielden via Maxwell introduced a minimum wage bill in parliament in 1835. The opposition of laisser faire members meant it had no chance; but Fielden continued to advocate action. The Royal Commission was agreed in 1837. By 1840 the number of weavers had dropped by 100,000. They had also, in numbers, become Chartists of the "physical force" tendency.

The Commission
The Royal Commission was chaired by Nassau William Senior. With him on the control board were William Edward Hickson, J. Leslie, and Samuel Jones Loyd.

Assistant commissioners
Regional reports were produced in five parts, in 1839 and 1840. There were nine assistant commissioners, assigned particular areas.

Investigative reports
Joseph Fletcher, who was secretary, reported on the Midlands. There were initially five assistant commissioners; five more positions were granted, but only four were taken up. The remaining funds were used to send Fletcher to the Midlands, and two of the assistant commissioners to the continent.

Symons reported in Part I in 1839; the other Parts appeared in 1840. Part II involved Mitchell, Austin and Keyser; Part III Chapman, Otway, and Muggeridge on Irish linen; Part V Miles, Muggeridge and Symons. Hickson made a separate report in 1840; in it he advocated abolition of the Corn Laws, and a system of national education.

Final report
The final report of the commission was dated 19 February 1841. Senior included in it extracts from an unpublished study he had made ten years earlier, after Lord Melbourne had invited him to report on trade combinations and strikes.

Notes

British Royal Commissions
1837 establishments in the United Kingdom
1841 disestablishments in the United Kingdom